Robert Palm (October 6, 1915 – July 1976) was an American Negro league catcher in the 1940s.

A native of Clarendon, Arkansas, Palm played for the Chicago American Giants in 1947. He died in St. Louis, Missouri in 1976 at age 60.

References

External links
 and Seamheads

1915 births
1976 deaths
Chicago American Giants players
Baseball catchers
Baseball players from Arkansas
People from Monroe County, Arkansas
20th-century African-American sportspeople